Ronald Eric Bishop CBE FRAeS (27 February 1903 – 11 June 1989), commonly referred to as R. E. Bishop, was a British engineer who was the chief designer of the de Havilland Mosquito, one of the most famous aircraft of the Second World War. He also designed the de Havilland Comet jetliner of 1949.

Early life
Bishop was born in Kensington, London, England.

Career
He joined de Havilland as an apprentice aged 18 in 1921, and would work there for the next 43 years. He joined the company's design office in 1923.

Bishop became the Chief Designer in 1936, taking over from Arthur Hagg. The first aircraft for which he was responsible was the DH95 Flamingo- the company's first all-metal monoplane. It had a stressed-skin and carried 17 passengers, first flying on 22 December 1938. Winston Churchill used one to journey to France in the early months of the war before Dunkirk (Operation Dynamo).

Also in his design team were:
 Charles Walker, chief engineer
 Richard Clarkson (responsible for aerodynamics), who would later design the Hawker Siddeley Trident (de Havilland DH121)
 A.P. Wilkins
 William Tamblin (later OBE, who designed the wings of the Mosquito and Comet)

Wartime
Starting in 1938, the outstanding achievement of his design office was the DH.98 Mosquito. Conceived as an unarmed bomber, it was expected to reach an unprecedented 376 mph, but managed 388 mph when first tested - Britain's fastest aircraft at the time - and became known as the Wooden Wonder. The Air Ministry had not been amenable to the radical and untried idea of an unarmed bomber, let alone one made of a seemingly obsolete material like wood, and did not fund the design. But Air Chief Marshal Sir Wilfrid Freeman was interested and boldly championed the concept - through official scepticism the plane became known as Freeman's Folly. However, his confidence was fully justified as it became the fastest wartime aircraft for two and a half years. The concept of a fast, unarmed bomber was amply justified in practice with very low loss rates. The plane was officially announced on 26 October 1942 - de Havilland's first military plane since the Airco DH.10 Amiens of the First World War. On 5 May 1943 its high speed prowess was announced.

The jet age
After the war, Bishop became the design director on the company's board of directors on 27 December 1946 until February 1964, when he retired. Later that year in October, he received the Gold Medal of the RAeS.

In December 1954, Tim Wilkins became head of design at de Havilland.

Designs

Aircraft he was responsible for were:
 Flamingo
 Mosquito
 Hornet
 Vampire – the first ever fighter aircraft to exceed 500 mph
 Dove – twin-engined propeller airliner in 1945
 Venom – developed from the Vampire
 Heron – four-engined propeller airliner in 1950
 DH.108 – the first British swept wing jet, mainly designed by John Carver Meadows Frost, and the first British aircraft to exceed the speed of sound
 DH106 Sea Vixen
 Comet – the world's first jet airliner in July 1949 and the first trans-atlantic jet service in October 1958, later used for the design of the Nimrod, and seeing service until 1973

Personal life
Bishop married Nora Armstrong in Rochford in 1936. They had two sons (one born in 1947). He received the CBE  1946 Birthday Honours. He lived at Fieldgate on Redbourn Lane (B487) in Hatching Green, Harpenden, then South Holme.

He died in St Albans in June 1989, at the age of 86.

See also
 List of de Havilland Mosquito operators
 List of surviving de Havilland Mosquitos
 Roy Chadwick, designer of the Lancaster
 Frank Halford, designer of DH jet engines
 Teddy Petter, designer of the Canberra

References

External links
 Flight Global September 1983 
 Der Spiegel

British aerospace engineers
1903 births
1989 deaths
De Havilland
De Havilland Comet
De Havilland Mosquito
Fellows of the Royal Aeronautical Society
People from Harpenden
People from Kensington
Royal Aeronautical Society Gold Medal winners